WingNut Films, Inc. is a New Zealand production company based in Wellington, with other offices in Hollywood, United States, London, United Kingdom, and Melbourne, Australia; notably for producing and collaborates predominantly with filmmaker Peter Jackson, especially on The Lord of the Rings. WingNut Films also has produced at Pinewood Studios in England.

History
WingNut Films has been involved in nearly all of Peter Jackson's work. The company is known for being involved in Jackson's The Lord of the Rings film series, based on the classic fantasy novel of the same name by English author J. R. R. Tolkien. The third film in the series received eleven Academy Awards including Best Picture and Best Director. The company also became involved in The Hobbit after director Guillermo del Toro left the project.

Films
 Bad Taste (1987)
 Meet the Feebles (1989)
 Braindead (1992)
 Valley of the Stereos (1992)
 Heavenly Creatures (1994)
 Forgotten Silver (1995)
 Jack Brown Genius (1996)
 The Frighteners (1996)
 The Lord of the Rings (2001—2003)
 King Kong (2005)
 District 9 (2009)
 The Lovely Bones (2009)
 The Adventures of Tintin (2011)
 West of Memphis (2012)
 The Hobbit (2012—2014)
 Mortal Engines (2018)
 They Shall Not Grow Old (2018)
 The Beatles: Get Back (2021)

Braindead lawsuit
Jackson's 1992 comedy horror film Braindead was subject to a lawsuit: In Bradley v WingNut Films Ltd [1993] 1 NZLR 415, it was alleged that Braindead had infringed the privacy of the plaintiffs by containing pictures of the plaintiff's family tombstone. After reviewing the New Zealand judicial authorities on privacy, Gallen J stated: "the present situation in New Zealand ... is that there are three strong statements in the High Court in favour of the existence of such a tort in this country and an acceptance by the Court of Appeal that the concept is at least arguable."  This case became one of a series of cases which contributed to the introduction of tort invasions of privacy in New Zealand.

See also
List of film production companies
List of television production companies

References

WingNut Films films
Companies based in Wellington
Companies based in Melbourne
Companies based in Los Angeles
Companies based in London
Mass media companies established in 1987
Film production companies of New Zealand